Ezekiel Caro (26 September 1844 – 24 December 1915) was a German rabbi and historian.

Biography
Caro was born in Pinne, Grand Duchy of Posen, in 1844. His father was the exegete and homiletic writer Joseph Ḥayyim Caro, rabbi at Włocławek, and his brother was historian Jacob Caro. He attended the gymnasium at Bromberg, the Jewish Theological Seminary, and the University of Breslau, where he studied philosophy and Oriental studies. Subsequently, he graduated as doctor of philosophy at the University of Heidelberg.

He was at first rabbi of the German-Jewish community of Lodz, Poland, and then at Mewe, western Prussia. He was afterwards successively rabbi at Dirschau (1870–79), Erfurt (1879–82), Pilsen (1881–91). In 1891 Caro became rabbi of the Tempel Synagogue in Lemberg, and became the city's chief progressive rabbi on 1 January 1898.

Caro's works include Ausgewählte Gelegenheitsreden (Danzig, 1874), Ein Vierteljahrhundert städtischer Verwaltung (Dirschau, 1880), Geschichte der Juden in Lemberg bis zur Theilung Polens (Cracow, 1894), as well as many sermons and essays in 's .

He left Lemberg for Vienna with the outbreak of World War I in 1914, dying there the following December.

Publications

References
 

1844 births
1915 deaths
19th-century German male writers
19th-century German writers
19th-century German rabbis
19th-century Polish rabbis
20th-century German rabbis
20th-century Polish rabbis
German Reform rabbis
Heidelberg University alumni
People from Pniewy
Polish Reform rabbis
Rabbis from Lviv
University of Breslau alumni
Writers from Lviv